The Revenge Tour was a concert tour by Kiss in support of the band's studio album Revenge.

Background
It was the first tour with drummer Eric Singer, replacing Eric Carr who died of cancer on November 24, 1991. Singer had previously performed with Paul Stanley's solo tour and was seen as a 'natural choice' according to Gene Simmons.

Kiss began the tour with a leg of club shows in North America. During the European leg of the tour in the United Kingdom, the stage set from the Hot in the Shade Tour was used. During the show at Cardiff National Ice Rink on May 20, 1992, a pyro cue for "Heaven's on Fire" caused £30,000 worth of damage to the ceiling.

For the North American arena tour, the stage featured a giant 41-foot high replica of the Statue of Liberty in front of a large Kiss logo wall. Halfway through the show during "War Machine", the statue's face crumbled to reveal its skull. Afterward, its right arm and torch crumbled down before its skeleton hand gave the finger, which some audiences took personally. The shows would also include strippers during the song "Take It Off". The stage was hauled by six to ten semi haulers while the replica of the Statue of Liberty had to fit into three trucks.

Due to poor ticket sales, the tour had to be shortened. There was a show set to take place in Spokane on December 13, but had been canceled due to weather affecting the band's travel between shows. The shows in Cleveland, Detroit and Indianapolis were recorded by Eddie Kramer for the Alive III live album.

In the tour program for the band's final tour, Simmons reflected on the tour:

Setlists
These are example setlists performed from one show on the tour, but may not represent the majority of the shows performed.

North American club and European legs
 "Love Gun"
 "Deuce"
 "Heaven's on Fire"
 "Parasite"
 "Shout It Out Loud"
 "Strutter"
 "Calling Dr. Love"
 "I Was Made For Lovin' You"
 "Unholy"
 "100,000 Years"
 "Take It Off"
 "God of Thunder"
 "Lick It Up"
 "Firehouse"
 "Tears Are Falling"
 "I Love It Loud"
 "I Stole Your Love"
 "Cold Gin"
 "Detroit Rock City"
 "I Want You"
 "God Gave Rock 'n' Roll to You II"
 "Rock And Roll All Nite"

North American arena leg
 "Creatures of the Night"
 "Deuce"
 "I Just Wanna"
 "Unholy"
 "Parasite"
 "Heaven's on Fire"
 "Domino"
 "Watchin' You"
 "Hotter Than Hell"
 "Firehouse"
 "I Want You"
 "Forever"
 "War Machine"
 "Rock and Roll All Nite"
 "Lick It Up"
 "Take It Off"
 "Strutter"
 "I Love It Loud"
 "Detroit Rock City"
 "Shout It Out Loud"
 "God Gave Rock 'n' Roll to You II"
 "Love Gun"
 "Star Spangled Banner"

Tour dates

Personnel 
 Paul Stanley – vocals, rhythm guitar
 Gene Simmons – vocals, bass
 Bruce Kulick – lead guitar, backing vocals
 Eric Singer – drums, backing vocals
Additional musician
 Derek Sherinian – keyboards

References 

1992 concert tours
Kiss (band) concert tours